Bagworth Heath Woods is a 75-hectare (185-acre) country park on the location of the former Desford Colliery, in Leicestershire, England consisting of woodland, grassland, heathland, lakes and ponds.

The site is linked to Thornton and Bagworth by the 100-mile circular walk around Leicestershire called the Leicestershire Round.

References 

Tourist attractions in Leicestershire
Parks and open spaces in Leicestershire
Country parks in Leicestershire